Guignen (Gallo: Ginyen) is a commune in the Ille-et-Vilaine department in Brittany in northwestern France.

Viscounts of Guignen
The title of Viscount of Guignen had been the property of the House of Rohan since the 15th century. It was passed through to the Princes of Condé, members of the House of Bourbon by a marriage between Louis Joseph de Bourbon, Prince of Condé to Charlotte de Rohan who was created Viscountess in 1745. At her death in 1760, it became one of the subsidiary titles of the Condé's being confiscated during the revolution.

Population
Inhabitants of Guignen are called Guignennais in French.

References

External links

Mayors of Ille-et-Vilaine Association  

Communes of Ille-et-Vilaine